The Fannichs are a range of mountains located in Highland, Scotland. It lies between Loch Fannich in the southeast and Loch Broom in the northwest. According to Edward Dwelly, the word "fannich" means "flat place".

It is well known for its high mountains, including nine Munros:
 Sgùrr Mòr 1,110m 
 Sgùrr nan Clach Geala 1,093m
 Sgurr Breac 999m
 A' Chailleach 997m
 Beinn Liath Mhòr Fanaich 954m
 Meall Gorm 949m 
 Meall a' Chrasgaidh 934m
 Sgùrr nan Each 923m 
 An Coileachan 923m

The Fannichs are also a Special Area of Conservation.

References

Mountain ranges of Scotland
Mountains and hills of Highland (council area)
Special Areas of Conservation in Scotland